Pleurotomella corrida is a species of sea snail, a marine gastropod mollusk in the family Raphitomidae.

Description
The length of the shell attains 4.7 mm.

Distribution
This marine species occurs off Georgia to Florida, USA

References

External links
 
 
  Edward J. Petuch, Biogeography and Biodiversity of Western Atlantic Mollusks; CRC Press, 2013

corrida
Gastropods described in 1927